Pogonopygia is a genus of moths in the family Geometridae.

Species
Pogonopygia nigralbata Warren, 1894
Pogonopygia pavida (Bastelberger, 1911)

References
Natural History Museum Lepidoptera genus database

Boarmiini